Nicolle Katherine Payne (born July 15, 1976) is an American water polo player. The goalkeeper was a member of the US teams that won the silver medal at the 2000 Sydney Olympics and the bronze medal at the 2004 Athens Olympics.

High school and college
Payne, a three-year water polo letterman at Gahr High School in Cerritos, California, gained additional water polo experience as a starter on the 1995 U.S. Junior National Team that earned a gold medal at the Pan American Games. Payne earned first-team all-league, team MVP, and All-California Interscholastic Federation honors.

Payne was the first woman recruited onto UCLA's new Title IX women's water polo team in 1994. In the 1996 season, she recorded 175 saves and a 3.07 goals against average (GAA). Payne was chosen as the National Player of the Year as a freshman. Nicolle Payne was hurt early in the 1997 season with a herniated disk and a strained vertebra, but she later returned to accumulate a 4.22 GAA in 72 quarters of play. The All-American goalkeeper captained the Bruin team from 1995–1998 and was a member of three national championship teams from 1996 to 1998. Payne finished her career at UCLA with her third national championship in 1998, with 13 saves in the final game. Her 2.77 GAA and 225 saves remain UCLA records. Payne graduated from UCLA in 1998 with a degree in Biology.

On October 9, 2009, Payne was inducted into the UCLA Athletics Hall of Fame.

International and Olympics
Payne played in the 2000 Olympic Games in Sydney and helped the U.S. bring home the silver medal. As goalkeeper for Team USA, she appeared in all seven games and recorded 19 saves, including eight against both Canada and Australia. At the 2003 FINA World Championships, her team won the gold medal. In the 2004 Olympic games in Athens, Payne was a member of the bronze medal women's water polo team.

In 2001, Payne served as assistant coach for the U.S. Junior National team when it captured the Junior National title in a 10-9 overtime victory over Australia. In 2006, Nicolle Payne began her fourth year as assistant coach for the UCLA women's water polo program. She was previously a UCLA assistant coach in the 2005, 2002 and 2001 seasons.

In February 2007, Payne was inducted into the New York Athletic Club (NYAC) Hall of Fame with fellow Olympic medalists Natalie Golda and Heather Moody. The three women were members of the bronze medal 2004 U.S. Olympic team in Athens, and are the first women added to the NYAC Hall of Fame.

See also
 United States women's Olympic water polo team records and statistics
 List of Olympic medalists in water polo (women)
 List of women's Olympic water polo tournament goalkeepers
 List of world champions in women's water polo
 List of World Aquatics Championships medalists in water polo

References 
 UCLA bio (2006)
 USA Water Polo: Water Polo Olympic Medalists to be inducted into NYAC Hall of Fame.

External links
 

1976 births
Living people
People from Paramount, California
People from Cerritos, California
American female water polo players
Water polo goalkeepers
Water polo players at the 2000 Summer Olympics
Water polo players at the 2004 Summer Olympics
Medalists at the 2004 Summer Olympics
Medalists at the 2000 Summer Olympics
Olympic silver medalists for the United States in water polo
Olympic bronze medalists for the United States in water polo
World Aquatics Championships medalists in water polo
UCLA Bruins women's water polo players
American water polo coaches